Blue is a 1968 American Western film directed by Silvio Narizzano and starring Terence Stamp, Joanna Pettet, Karl Malden, Ricardo Montalbán, and Stathis Giallelis. The film was made in Panavision anamorphic and released by Paramount Pictures on May 10, 1968.

Plot
The year is 1880. Mexican bandit and revolutionary Ortega (Ricardo Montalbán) has three sons, Xavier (Carlos East), Manuel (Stathis Giallelis) and Antonio (Robert Lipton), as well as one adopted son, Azul (Terence Stamp), which means "Blue." the color of the young man's eyes. While attacking Texas settlers, Antonio is fatally shot while Azul, feeling pity for one of the settler women, Joanne (Joanna Pettet), whom Manuel is about to rape, puts a deadly bullet into Manuel, as he is shot, himself, by one of the settlers.

Joanne tells her father, Doc (Karl Malden), that Azul saved her and they nurse him back to health in their home. Ortega finds Azul and asks him to come back, but when Azul refuses, threatens to come back and wipe out the settlers. Azul organizes the settlers into a defense force which manages to decimate the attackers, including Ortega and Xavier. Before dying, Ortega asks Azul to bury him in Mexico. Carrying out Ortega's dying wish, Azul is shot by the fatally wounded Carlos (Joe De Santis), Ortega's closest compatriot. Joanne brings Azul's body back for burial in Texas.

Cast

Production
Parts of the film were shot at Professor Valley, Sevenmile Canyon, Long Valley, Kane Creek Road, the Sand Flats, La Sal Mountains, and the Klondike Flats in Utah.

The production of the film in Utah was used for the 1968 film Fade In starring Burt Reynolds and Barbara Loden. Loden plays an assistant film editor who falls in love with a rancher played by Reynolds.

Evaluation in film guides
Steven H. Scheuer's Movies on TV gives Blue 1 star (out of 4), stating "[I]t took many celebrated names on both sides of the camera to botch up this western drama", continuing that "[T]he tale... should have been more fascinating than it turns out" and concluding with "[D]irector Silvio Narizzano was responsible for the lovely "Georgy Girl" so we can't blame him entirely for this no-color no-flavor western". Later editions retained the 1 star rating, but featured a shortened, rewritten review which called Blue a "[W]estern oddity" that exhibited "[A] peculiar blend of sagebrush and psychology". Leonard Maltin's Movie Guide did not have a much higher opinion, giving 1 stars (out of 4) and denigrating it as an "[U]ndistinguished, poorly written Western". Later editions added the words "See also FADE-IN", which Maltin's review describes as an "[O]dd little film made concurrently with BLUE" and notes that "BLUE actors Terence Stamp, Joanna Pettet, Ricardo Montalbán and Sally Kirkland can be glimpsed here".

As in Maltin, The Motion Picture Guide assigned 1½ stars (out of 5), calling it "a waste of time from the outset" and pointing out "[P]retentious direction by Narizzano with Leone-like close-ups and Peckinpah-like slow-motion". The write-up further states, "[T]his movie cost about five million, more than two million over budget. A waste for everyone concerned." Near the end there is mention that "Giallelis (Manuel) made such a splash in Kazan's AMERICA, AMERICA that great things were expected of him. He never should have taken this role."

Two additional guides also rank Blue at or near bottom. Videohound's Golden Movie Retriever threw the film one bone (out of possible four), describing it as "[A] dull western", while Mick Martin's and Marsha Porter's DVD & Video Guide served its lowest rating, "Turkey", stating "God-awful, pretentious Western with Terence Stamp as a monosyllabic gunman."

Among British references, Leslie Halliwell, in his Film Guide, gave no stars (Halliwell's top rating is 4), dismissing it as a "[P]retentious, self-conscious, literary Western without much zest." A quote from Rex Reed was also included, "I don't know which is worse — bad cowboy movies or bad arty cowboy movies. Blue is both." TimeOut Film Guide founding editor Tom Milne was also dismissive, finding it "[A] grotesque, pretension-ridden Western which falls flat on its face with a ponderous yarn about...", while adding that "Terence Stamp struggles unavailingly against the ludicrous dialogue and some fine landscape photography by Stanley Cortez is wrecked by a penchant for gaudy filters and even gaudier sunsets."

References

External links

 
 
 
 
 
 Blue at TV Guide (revised form of this 1987 write-up was originally published in The Motion Picture Guide)

1968 films
1968 Western (genre) films
Paramount Pictures films
Films directed by Silvio Narizzano
American Western (genre) films
Films shot in Utah
Films scored by Manos Hatzidakis
1960s English-language films
1960s American films